Suan Lum Night Bazaar Ratchadaphisek or The Bazaar Ratchadaphisek (Thai: สวนลุมไนท์บาซาร์ รัชดาภิเษก) is a mixed-use complex comprising The Bazaar Hotel that accommodates up to 800 rooms, Podstel Hostel Bangkok that hosts over 100 beds, offices, municipal shops, restaurants, a 24-hour supermarket and convenience stores, street food stalls, Bangkok Sky Gym and pool, Top Fight Muay Thai gyms, and a 450-seat theater. Upon completion, the building is one of the longest in length in Bangkok, stretching 1.5 kilometres.

Suan Lum Night Bazaar
The developer of this project is the same owner of Suan Lum Night Bazaar, next to Lumpini Park in Bangkok. Due to the expired lease PCon Development (the owner of Suan Lum) is building this large scale mall and open air market. Some of the vendors of Suan Lum Night Bazaar will move to this new location. The landlord of the former location is the Crown Property Bureau which leased the land to Central Group.

Ratchada Night Market
Already present at the new location, under the same developer, was the Ratchada Night Market. In 2010–2012, most vendors closed down to make way for the new construction of the mall and open-air market. Many relocated to the Train Night Market or Siam Gypsy Junction.

Transportation
Bus number 8, 27, 44, 73, 92, 96, 145, 191, 186, 502, 514, 545 
MRT Ladprao (exit 1)
MRT Ratchadaphiesk

Shopping
The market has two zones, indoors and outdoors. Vendors indoors sell a variety of souvenirs, home decorations, arts, clothes, shoes, and other tourist goods. The outdoor zone includes local food stalls, a variety of restaurants, a sports bar, and Boots and 7-11 convenience stores.

References

External links
http://www.thebazaarhotel.com
https://www.facebook.com/suanlumnight
https://www.topfightmuaythai.com/

Hotels in Bangkok
Chatuchak district